CHVN-FM (95.1 FM) is a radio station licensed to Winnipeg, Manitoba, broadcasting a contemporary christian music format. The station is currently owned by Golden West Broadcasting. CHVN's studios are located on St. Mary's Road in south Winnipeg, while its transmitter is located near Springstein.

History 
In January 2000, the CRTC approved an application by Christian Radio Manitoba Ltd. for a new specialty FM radio station in Winnipeg, focusing predominantly on Christian music. The group originally planned to broadcast on 107.1 FM, but this was denied by Industry Canada. The station instead chose to broadcast on 95.1 FM instead.

In 2004, Golden West Broadcasting acquired a controlling stake in Christian Radio Manitoba Ltd.

References

External links
 CHVN 95.1
 
Decision CRTC 2000-313

Hvn
Hvn
Hvn
Radio stations established in 2000
2000 establishments in Manitoba